Ira Lee Harge (born March 14, 1941) is a retired American professional basketball player. Born in Anguilla, Mississippi, Harge played high school basketball in Detroit, Michigan before starring in college at the University of New Mexico.  He played professionally in the American Basketball Association for six seasons, playing on two ABA championship teams. Harge earned a master's degree in education from UNM in 1969 and became a coach and teacher in Albuquerque after his playing career ended.

College career

Burlington Junior College 

Harge initially enrolled at Bowling Green but was forced to cut short his freshman year and return home when his father became ill. He then went to Burlington Junior College in Iowa, where he was named a Juco All-American as a freshman after averaging 31 points and 21 rebounds a game. He averaged 39 a game in the JC national championship tournament, including a high game of 47 points.
He averaged 26.4 a game as a sophomore, leading Burlington to a conference title.

University of New Mexico 

Harge transferred as a junior to New Mexico in 1962 to play for new Lobo coach Bob King, and together they would transform the program over the next two years. The Lobos had been dismal during the
previous eight seasons, going 42–149 (.220). During their two seasons with Harge, the Lobos went 39–15 (.722), becoming a nationally ranked NIT finalist and setting the table for the continued success of the UNM program.

In 1962–63, the Lobos began the season 9–2, including wins over Texas Tech and at rival New Mexico State. They were 14–4 before losing five straight WAC conference games, four of those on the road.  They finished the season 16–9, the best Lobo record in seventeen years.  Harge led the team, averaging 21.1 points and 13.2 rebounds a game, setting then-Lobo records for points and rebounds in a season. Harge also spearheaded a defense that
gave up fewer than 58 points a game on the season, and the team's success led to the first sell out of a Lobo home game.

College stats 

|-
| style="text-align:left;"| 1962–63
| style="text-align:left;"| New Mexico
| 25 || 25 ||  || .541 ||  || .631 || 13.2 ||  ||  ||  || 21.1
|-
| style="text-align:left;"| 1963–64
| style="text-align:left;"| New Mexico
| 29 || 29 ||  || .432 ||  || .649 || 10.5 ||  ||  ||  || 16.8
|-
| style="text-align:left;"| Career
| style="text-align:left;"|
| 54 || 54 ||  || .484 ||  || .640 || 11.8 ||  ||  ||  || 18.8
|-

 Bold indicates team leader

Professional career 

Harge was selected with the 4th pick in the 2nd round (11th overall) in the 1964 NBA draft by the Philadelphia 76ers. Previously, in 1963, he was also selected with the 4th pick, but in the 7th round (57th overall) by the Detroit Pistons. But Harge opted to play professionally in the American Basketball Association.

Harge played six seasons (1967–1973) in the ABA as a member of the Pittsburgh Pipers (1967–68), Oakland Oaks / Washington Caps (1968–1970), Carolina Cougars (1970–1971 and 1973), Floridians (1971–1972), and Utah Stars (1971–1973). He played on the Pittsburgh Pipers team that won the 1968 ABA Championship, and he won the 1969 ABA Championship with the Oakland Oaks. Harge maintained a double-double average (10.3 points, 11.6 rebounds) over the course of his ABA career and ranks tenth on the ABA's all-time list for total rebounds (4,955).

Post-playing career 
Harge earned a degree from UNM in education and coached and taught in the Albuquerque Public School system from 1965–67, before returning to basketball. While he was playing in the ABA, he completed a master's degree in education at UNM. After his playing career ended, he returned to reside in Albuquerque.

In 1986, Harge was inducted into the New Mexico Sports Hall of Fame, and in 1993 he was inducted into the UNM Athletics Hall of Honor.

Notes

External links 
Ira Harge, Basketball-Reference.com
Ira Harge, New Mexico Athletics Official Site

1941 births
Living people
American men's basketball players
Basketball players from Mississippi
Carolina Cougars players
Centers (basketball)
Detroit Pistons draft picks
Junior college men's basketball players in the United States
Miami Floridians players
New Mexico Lobos men's basketball players
Oakland Oaks players
People from Anguilla, Mississippi
Philadelphia 76ers draft picks
Pittsburgh Pipers players
Utah Stars players
Washington Caps players
Northeastern High School (Michigan) alumni